Moby (titled The Story So Far in the UK) is the debut studio album by American electronica musician Moby, released in July 1992 by record label Instinct.

Content 

The song listed as "Go" on the American and German editions is in fact an shortened version of the "Woodtick Mix".

"Thousand", a song only included on the German edition of the album, was listed in Guinness World Records for having the fastest beats-per-minute (BPM) tempo, clocking in at over 1,000 BPM, hence its name.

Release 

Moby was released by the New York-based independent label Instinct Records on July 27, 1992. In an interview with Billboard at the time of the album's release, Moby stated that "all the songs are at least a year old. It's not entirely reflective of where I'm coming from right now" and that "the label had the legal right to put it out, the best thing for me to do is view it as more a retrospective and get on with my life".

The album was issued without Moby's cooperation. In Martin James' book Moby < Replay – The Life and Times, Moby recalled that he was so angry about the release of the album that he actively spoke out against it in any promotional work. He went on to say:

By 2016, however, Moby had softened his stance on Moby and its Instinct Records-issued follow-up Ambient somewhat, stating that he "really like[d] them almost as odd time capsules".

Track listing

Personnel 
Credits for Moby adapted from album liner notes.

 Moby – production, writing

Artwork and design
 Dave Brubaker – artwork, design
 Electric Muse Graphics – artwork, design
 Jill Greenberg – photography

References

External links
 
 

1992 debut albums
Moby albums
Techno albums by American artists
Albums produced by Moby
Instinct Records albums